Kapisturia Cove is the 1.65 km wide cove indenting for 1.9 km Danco Coast in Graham Land, Antarctica just south of Eurydice Peninsula.  It is part of Charlotte Bay and has its head fed by Bozhinov Glacier.

The cove is named after the ancient fortress of Kapisturia in Southern Bulgaria.

Location
British mapping in 1978.

Maps
British Antarctic Territory. Scale 1:200000 topographic map. DOS 610 Series, Sheet W 64 60. Directorate of Overseas Surveys, Tolworth, UK, 1978.
 Antarctic Digital Database (ADD). Scale 1:250000 topographic map of Antarctica. Scientific Committee on Antarctic Research (SCAR). Since 1993, regularly upgraded and updated.

References
 Bulgarian Antarctic Gazetteer. Antarctic Place-names Commission. (details in Bulgarian, basic data in English)
 Kapisturia Cove. SCAR Composite Gazetteer of Antarctica.

External links
 Kapisturia Cove. Copernix satellite image

Coves of Graham Land
Bulgaria and the Antarctic
Danco Coast